Penick is a surname. Notable people with the surname include:

Charles Clifton Penick (1843–1914), American Anglican bishop
Harvey Penick (1904–1995), American golfer and coach
John Penick (born 1944), American science educator and scholar
Mark A. Penick (1906–1952), American lawyer and politician